Ceroplesis is a genus of flat-faced longhorn beetle in the subfamily Lamiinae of the family Cerambycidae.

Species
 Ceroplesis adusta (Harold, 1879)
 Ceroplesis aenescens Fairmaire, 1893
 Ceroplesis aestuans (Olivier, 1795)
 Ceroplesis aethiopica Breuning, 1974
 Ceroplesis aethiops (Fabricius, 1775)
 Ceroplesis analeptoides Lepesme, 1950
 Ceroplesis arcuata Harold, 1879
 Ceroplesis aulica Pascoe, 1875
 Ceroplesis bicincta (Fabricius, 1798)
 Ceroplesis blairi Breuning, 1937
 Ceroplesis buettneri (Kolbe, 1863)
 Ceroplesis burgeoni Breuning, 1935
 Ceroplesis calabarica Chevrolat, 1858
 Ceroplesis capensis (Linnaeus, 1764)
 Ceroplesis conradti Kolbe, 1893
 Ceroplesis elegans Gestro, 1889
 Ceroplesis elgonensis Aurivillius, 1923
 Ceroplesis fasciata Aurivillius, 1913
 Ceroplesis ferrugator (Fabricius, 1787)
 Ceroplesis granulata Breuning, 1937
 Ceroplesis griseotincta Fairmaire, 1891
 Ceroplesis hamiltoni Aurivillius, 1915
 Ceroplesis harrisoni Jordan, 1895
 Ceroplesis hauseri Hintz, 1910
 Ceroplesis hecate Chevrolat, 1855
 Ceroplesis hintzi Breuning, 1937
 Ceroplesis hottentotta (Fabricius, 1775)
 Ceroplesis intermedia Aurivillius, 1925
 Ceroplesis marmorata Reiche, 1849
 Ceroplesis massaica Aurivillius, 1908
 Ceroplesis militaris Gerstäcker, 1855
 Ceroplesis millingeni Pic, 1895
 Ceroplesis minuta Jordan, 1894
 Ceroplesis molator (Fabricius, 1787)
 Ceroplesis mucorea (Kolbe, 1893)
 Ceroplesis nigromaculata Aurivillius, 1910
 Ceroplesis orientalis (Herbst, 1786)
 Ceroplesis poggei Harold, 1878
 Ceroplesis quinquefasciata (Fabricius, 1792)
 Ceroplesis reticulata Gahan, 1909
 Ceroplesis revoili Fairmaire, 1882
 Ceroplesis rubrocincta (Hintz, 1911)
 Ceroplesis rubrovariegata Aurivillius, 1925
 Ceroplesis rugosopunctata Aurivillius, 1925
 Ceroplesis scorteccii Breuning, 1940
 Ceroplesis semitrabeata Fairmaire, 1887
 Ceroplesis signata Waterhouse, 1890
 Ceroplesis strandi Breuning, 1935
 Ceroplesis sudanica Aurivillius, 1925
 Ceroplesis sumptuosa Pascoe, 1875
 Ceroplesis suturalis Harold, 1880
 Ceroplesis thunbergii Fahraeus, 1872

References
Biolib
Cerambycoidea